Crossea gatliffi is a species of small sea snail or micromollusc, a marine gastropod mollusc in the family Conradiidae.

Description
(Original description by Charles Hedley) The height of the shell attains 1.16 mm, its diameter 1.1 mm. The small, thin shell has a globose-conical shape with four whorls and an elevated spire. The basal funicle is slightly developed. Its colour is white (perhaps bleached ?).

Sculpture:The body whorl shows fine, close spiral threads of which every fourth is larger. At irregular intervals incipient varices traverse the whorl. On the penultimate whorl the spiral sculpture is more coarse and distant. The umbilicus is narrow, bordered by a slight rib, which, continuing to the anterior extremity, is there notched by the pseudocanal. The aperture is oval. The thin outer lip is everted.

The thin shell, lack of longitudinal sculpture, tabulated whorls, and feeble basal funicule distinguish it.

Distribution
This marine species is endemic to Australia. It occurs off the Northern Territory and Queensland

References

 Hedley, C. 1902. Studies on Australian Mollusca. Part VI. Proceedings of the Linnean Society of New South Wales 27: 7-29
 Cotton, B.C. 1959. South Australian Mollusca. Archaeogastropoda. Handbook of the Flora and Fauna of South Australia. Adelaide : South Australian Government Printer 449 pp.

External links
 To World Register of Marine Species

gatliffi
Gastropods described in 1902